King of Hearts (original French title: Le Roi de cœur) is a 1966 French/Italian international co-production comedy-drama film directed by Philippe de Broca and starring Alan Bates and Geneviève Bujold.

The film is set in a small town in France near the end of World War I. As the Imperial German Army retreats, they booby trap the whole town to explode. The locals flee and, left to their own devices, a gaggle of cheerful lunatics escape the asylum and take over the town — thoroughly confusing the lone Scottish soldier who has been dispatched to defuse the bomb.

Though the film is set during WWI, the main message against war which the film pushes is intended to be about the Vietnam war, which France had already been involved in for over a decade at that point. The connection between the "war to end all wars" and the then current conflict would have been obvious to French moviegoers at the time. Likewise its status as a cult film is largely because of its connection to the anti-war movement in the 1960s.

Plot
Signaller Charles Plumpick (Bates) is a kilt-wearing French-born Scottish soldier caring for war pigeons, who is sent by his commanding officer to disarm a bomb placed in the town square by the retreating Germans.

After the townspeople learn about the booby trap, its inhabitants—including those who run the insane asylum—abandon it.  The asylum gates are left open, and the inmates leave the asylum and take on the roles of the townspeople. Plumpick has no reason to think they are not who they appear to be—other than the colorful and playful way in which they're living their lives, so at odds with the fearful and war-ravaged times.  The lunatics crown Plumpick the King of Hearts with surreal pageantry as he frantically tries to find the bomb before it goes off.

Theatrical releases
When it was released in France in 1966, King of Hearts was not especially successful critically or at the box office, with only 141,035 admissions.

However, it achieved bona fide cult-film status, when United States distribution rights were picked up by Randy Finley and Specialty Films in Seattle in 1973. It was paired with Marv Newland's Bambi Meets Godzilla and John Magnuson's Thank You Mask Man and marketed under the heading The King of Hearts and His Loyal Short Subjects.  During the mid 1970s, it was presented in repertory movie theaters as well as non-theatrical college and university film series across the United States, eventually running for five years at the now defunct film house, the Central Square Cinemas (2 screens) in Cambridge, Massachusetts.

Main cast
 Jacques Balutin as Le Sergent Mac Fish
 Alan Bates as Le Soldat Charles Plumpick
 Daniel Boulanger as Le Colonel Von Krack
 Pierre Brasseur as Le Général Géranium
 Jean-Claude Brialy as Le Duc de Trèfle
 Geneviève Bujold as Coquelicot
 Pier Paolo Capponi as Un Officier Anglais
 Adolfo Celi as Le Colonel Mac Bibenbrook
 Françoise Christophe as La Duchesse
 Daniel Prévost as Le Général Vallemat
  as Brunehaut
 Marc Dudicourt as Lieutenant Hamburger
 Julien Guiomar as Monseigneur Marguerite
 Palau as Alberic
 Micheline Presle as Madame Eglantine
 Michel Serrault as Monsieur Marcel

Uncredited
Philippe de Broca as Adolf Hitler

Stage adaptation

In 1978, King of Hearts was adapted as a Broadway musical of the same name, with a book by Joseph Stein, lyrics by Jacob Brackman, music by Peter Link, orchestrations by Bill Brohn, set design by Santo Loquasto, and direction and choreography by Ron Field. The cast featured Don Scardino as the lead character, who was reworked as an American soldier named Johnny Perkins. Pamela Blair, Bob Gunton, and Millicent Martin played supporting roles. Opening at New York City's Minskoff Theatre on October 22, amid the three-month 1978 New York City newspaper strike that may have impeded its advance publicity, the show closed after 48 performances.

References

External links
 
 
 

1966 films
1960s war comedy-drama films
Anti-war films about World War I
Western Front (World War I) films
Films scored by Georges Delerue
Films directed by Philippe de Broca
Films set in France
Films set in psychiatric hospitals
Films shot in France
French war comedy-drama films
1960s French-language films
1966 drama films
1960s French films